Derrick Jones (born December 4, 1994) is an American football cornerback and wide receiver for the New Orleans Breakers of the United States Football League (USFL). He played college football at Ole Miss. He was drafted by the New York Jets in the sixth round of the 2017 NFL Draft.

College career
Coming in to the Ole Miss Rebels football program as a three-star wide receiver, Jones switched to cornerback his freshman year and started four games. He then split his time at the two positions over his sophomore and junior seasons, playing sparingly at corner but working his way up to starting wide receiver junior year. However, Jones switched back to corner for his senior season.  At the start of his senior year, Jones was suspended three games for violating the Rebels' conduct standards. In 2016, Jones took his first interception for a touchdown.

Professional career

New York Jets
Jones was drafted by the New York Jets in the sixth round, 204th overall, in the 2017 NFL Draft.

On August 10, 2019, Jones was waived by the Jets.

Green Bay Packers
On August 11, 2019, Jones was claimed off waivers by the Green Bay Packers, but was waived two days later after failing his physical.

Houston Texans
On August 19, 2019, Jones was signed by the Houston Texans. He was waived with an injury settlement on August 26.

Seattle Dragons
Jones signed with the Seattle Dragons of the XFL on January 14, 2020. He was waived during final roster cuts on January 22, 2020. Jones was signed to the XFL's practice squad team, referred to as Team 9, on January 30, 2020. He was re-signed by the Dragons on February 25, 2020. He had his contract terminated when the league suspended operations on April 10, 2020.

Calgary Stampeders
In early 2022, Jones signed a futures contract with the Calgary Stampeders of the Canadian Football League (CFL). After registering to play in the USFL he was released by the Stampeders on April 8.

New Orleans Breakers 
While still under contract with the Stampeders Jones then signed a separate contract with the United States Football League and entered the 2022 USFL Draft, where he was drafted as a cornerback by the New Orleans Breakers, without informing the USFL of his contract with the Stampeders. On February 23, 2022 Jones denied he had made a commitment to the Stampeders. He was released by the Breakers on April 1, 2022. He re-signed with the Breakers on April 14, and was transferred to the team's practice squad before the start of the regular season on April 16, 2022. He was transferred to the active roster on April 22.

References

External links
Ole Miss Rebels bio

1994 births
Living people
American football cornerbacks
Calgary Stampeders players
Green Bay Packers players
Houston Texans players
New Orleans Breakers (2022) players
New York Jets players
Ole Miss Rebels football players
People from Eupora, Mississippi
Players of American football from Mississippi
Seattle Dragons players
Team 9 players